The Cowlitz Indian Tribe is a federally recognized tribe of Cowlitz people. They are a tribe of Southwestern Coast Salish and Sahaptan indigenous people of the Pacific Northwest located in Washington.

Other Cowlitz people are enrolled in the Confederated Tribes of the Chehalis Reservation, Confederated Tribes and Bands of the Yakima Nation, and Quinault Indian Nation.

Reservation
The Cowlitz Reservation was established in 2010. The  reservation is located near Ridgefield, in Clark County, Washington.

Government
The Cowlitz Indian Tribe is headquartered in Longview, Washington. The tribe is governed by a democratically elected board of tribal council members.

Salish is commonly spoken by the tribe. The Cowlitz language belongs to the Tsamosan branch of Salishan languages. A dictionary has been published for Cowlitz.

Economic development
The Cowlitz Indian Tribe has built the Ilani Casino Resort with ten restaurants and plans for a hotel, located near Ridgefield, Washington.

History
Cowlitz people actively traded with other tribes and later European Americans. 19th century treaties were not ratified by the United States or were unacceptable to the Cowlitz. In 1906 the tribe, under the leadership of Chief Atwin Stockum, began formal political relations with the United States. The Cowlitz Indian Tribe has had its constitutional elective tribal council system of government since 1950. Federal recognition was confirmed in 2000, and was reaffirmed in 2002.

Notes

References
 Pritzker, Barry M. A Native American Encyclopedia: History, Culture, and Peoples. Oxford: Oxford University Press, 2000. .

External links
 Cowlitz Indian Tribe, official website

Coast Salish governments
Native American tribes in Washington (state)
Geography of Clark County, Washington
Federally recognized tribes in the United States
Indigenous peoples of the Pacific Northwest Coast